Victor & Maria is a British animated children's television series produced by King Rollo Films. It originally broadcast on the British TV channel ITV in 1983, it told the stories of a large polar bear, Victor, and his friend Maria, a little girl. Some episodes would feature Victor's cousin, Otto (a brown bear) and Maria's friend, Matilda.

There were 26 episodes in the show, each lasting 5 minutes long.

External links
 

1980s British children's television series
1980s British animated television series
1983 British television series debuts
1983 British television series endings
1980s preschool education television series
British children's animated adventure television series
British children's animated fantasy television series
British preschool education television series
Animated preschool education television series
English-language television shows
ITV children's television shows
Animated television series about bears
Fictional polar bears
Animated television series about children
Works about friendship
Television shows set in the United Kingdom